Lewis County is the name of seven counties in the United States:

Lewis County, Idaho 
Lewis County, Kentucky 
Lewis County, Missouri 
Lewis County, New York 
Lewis County, Tennessee 
Lewis County, Washington 
Lewis County, West Virginia

See also:
Lewis and Clark County, Montana
St. Louis County (disambiguation)